Tini Kerei Taiaroa (born Tini Pana;  – 4 September 1934) was a notable New Zealand founding mother and community worker. Of Māori descent, she identified with the Ngāi Tahu iwi. She was born at Moeraki, New Zealand, in about 1846.

References

1846 births
1934 deaths
Ngāi Tahu people
People from Otago
Ellison family